Ahmet Haldun Dormen (born 5 April 1928) is a Turkish theater, movie and TV series actor and film director. Dormen is of Turkish Cypriot descent.

Biography 

His father Sait Ömer Bey was a Cypriot businessman, while his mother Nimet Rüştü Hanım was the daughter of a pasha from Istanbul. His family settled in Şişli before Dormen's first birthday. He had his first acting experience on stage as a junior high school student at the Galatasaray High School, portraying a character in a play titled Demirbank.
He finished his education at  the Robert College. At the age of eight, his left foot was injured due to an accident.

For his theater education, he went to the USA and studied at Yale University. He graduated with a master's degree. For two years, he worked as an actor and director in various theaters in the United States. He performed in 4 plays in Pasadena Playhouse in Hollywood. When he returned to Istanbul, he entered the Küçük Sahne stage under the direction of Muhsin Ertuğrul and had his first role in front of the Turkish audience with the play Cinayet Var.

On the night of 22 August 1955, he performed in the first play organized by the Dormen Theater in the Süreyya cinema. He continued to appear in the plays at the Küçük Sahne Theater after receiving an offer by them in September 1957. In 1957, he founded the Dormen Theater with the comedy play Papaz Kaçtı. He gave roles to dozens of artists in his plays, including Erol Günaydın, Altan Erbulak, Metin Serezli, Nisa Serezli, Erol Keskin, İzzet Günay, Yılmaz Köksal, and Ayfer Feray. The party had their golden period between the years 1957-1972. In 1961, he brought the first Western-themed musical on stage in Turkey under the title Street Girl İrma. Gülriz Sururi first became known in Turkey with her role as İrma in this play. In 1962, he moved to the historical Ses Theater in Beyoğlu, and continued his works there for 10 years.

Dormen later directed two cinematic movies: Bozuk Düzen and Güzel Bir Gün İçin. Alongside the Dormen Theater squad, the likes of Belgin Doruk, Ekrem Bora, Nurhan Nur, Müşfik Kenter, and Nedret Güvenç appeared in these movies. The two movies received seven awards in total at the Golden Orange Film Festival in 1966 and 1967, but they weren't commercially successful in the box office.

In 1972, he closed his theater and turned to television, writing and teaching. He then appeared in numerous TV programs such as Unutulanlar, Anılarla Söyleşi, Kamera Arkası, Dadı, and Popstar Türkiye. He then joined Milliyet as a journalist and contributed to the column Variations. His career in Milliyet lasted for eight years.

In 1981, he met Egemen Bostancı. Later, he wrote and directed the musicals Hisseli Harikalar Kumpanyası and Şen Sazın Bülbülleri. In 1984, with Egemen Bostancı's insistence, he re-established the Dormen Theater again and the organization continued to operate for 17 years. In the same years, he brought The Luxurious Life back to stage at the Istanbul City Theatres with Gencay Gürün serving as the producer. He later directed The Luxurious Life for the İzmir and Mersin Opera and the Eskişehir City Theater.

In 2002, he closed his theater due to economic reasons but continued to act and directed in various theaters.

Haldun Dormen has written five book, including four biographies ("Sürç-ü Lisan Ettikse",  "Antrakt", "İkinci Perde", "Nerede Kalmıştık"),  and two plays. His play Kantocu, which sheds light on the experiences of female stage artists during the foundation years of the Republic, was staged in Istanbul, Eskişehir, and Ankara.

Dormen married Betül Mardin, a world-renowned figure in public relations in 1959, and a son named Ömer was born from this marriage that lasted eight years.

Dormen, who is currently the art consultant of the Sahne Tozu Theater in İzmir, has staged various plays in their salon. (Sahne Tozu Theater Haldun Dormen Stage - İzmir). He also gives musical lessons at the Sahne Tozu Theater Nişantaşı Academy.

Filmography 
Actor:
 "Guzel Bir Gün İçin" (1965)
 "Hüdaverdi - Pırtık" (1971)
 "Bizimkiler" (1971)
 "Yorgun Savaşçı" (1979)
 "Gırgıriye" (1981)
 "Dadı" (TV series) (2001)
 "Yeşil Işık" (2002)
 "Sayın Bakanım" (TV series) (2004)
 "Vuurzee" (Dutch TV series) (2005 - 2006/2009)
 ""Unutulmayanlar" (2006)

Director:
 "Guzel Bir Gün İçin" (1965)
 "Bozuk Düzen" (1966)

Producer:
 "Guzel Bir Gün İçin" (1965)
 "Bozuk Düzen"'' (1966)

References

External links 
 
 Biyografi.info - Biography of Haldun Dormen

1928 births
People from Mersin
Living people
State Artists of Turkey
Best Screenplay Golden Orange Award winners
Robert College alumni
Galatasaray High School alumni
Yale School of Drama alumni
Turkish people of Cypriot descent
Turkish male stage actors
Turkish male film actors
Turkish male television actors
Turkish film directors